Tyrosine-protein kinase STYK1 is an enzyme that in humans is encoded by the STYK1 gene.

References

Further reading